Emergency Alert Australia is an emergency communications scheme set up by the Australian Commonwealth Government in response to the Black Saturday bushfires of 2009, utilizing telecommunications systems as another form of alert for citizens. The system sends both SMS messages and pre-recorded sound messages with information regarding the alert which can be statewide, or reduced to a small location.

Landline message
The landline telephone message starts off with the Standard Emergency Warning Signal (SEWS) followed by the words "Emergency! Emergency!" which is then followed by a verbal alert in English regarding the type of threat, the appropriate action and a telephone number or website where more information can be found.

SMS message
The SMS message is similar to the Landline message but is written in English text rather than a verbal warning. SEWS is not used for this type of message but still contains information about the type of threat, appropriate action and a telephone number or website where more information can be found. The originating number is 0444 444 444 which can only send out messages, it cannot receive messages or calls. This is the same number that is used for the landline message if Caller ID is used on the particular phone, and it is possible to block these alerts by adding this number to the "blocked callers" list.

The Government coordinates the identification of emergency and response. Having developed an appropriate message and area of interest, they then provide a suitable message and area of land within which to send to each mobile phone network operator who then in turn identify all subscribers within that area using the mobile network and then send the message as an SMS using the originating number above. No subscriber information is shared between the operators, and no subscriber information is shared with the Government.

Alerting Channel

The SMS solution in Australia is different from other international solutions such as the US CMAS (Wireless Emergency Alerts) or New Zealand's Emergency Mobile Alert which uses the public warning Cell Broadcast technology. The CB messages can be received by cellphones which are capable of and configured to receiving CB messages, currently 100% of all Mobile phones sold in New Zealand support natively Cell Broadcast. Alert SMSes can also reach all cellphones however with a significant delay compared to Cell Broadcast. However, SMS alert systems have the advantage of knowing how many people are within the emergency area, if they have received the message and taken action as a result. SMS messages will be received by all cellphones, including roamers that in many cases can't receive CB messages. The alert plays several alert tones, then lists the emergency details. On television, critical details will be broadcast on screen.

References

External links
 Emergency Alert Australia
 Alert SA
Frequently Asked Questions for Emergency Alert Australia

Emergency communication
Emergency management in Australia
Emergency population warning systems